Frederico Gil and Daniel Gimeno-Traver were the defending champions, but Gil decided not to participate.
Gimeno-Traver played alongside Albert Ramos, but lost in the first round to Carlos Berlocq and Leonardo Mayer.
Paolo Lorenzi and Potito Starace won the title, defeating Juan Mónaco and Rafael Nadal 6–2, 6–4 in the final.

Seeds

Draw

Draw

References
 Main Draw

VTR Open - Doubles
2013 Doubles